The Polícia Militar do Estado do Espírito Santo ("Military Police of the State of Espírito Santo"), also known as PMES, is a law enforcement organization that serves the Brazilian state of Espírito Santo.

History
The PMES was established on April 6, 1835 by local state governor Manoel José Pires da Silva Pontes. After the military coup of 1889, which resulted in the transformation of Brazil from a monarchy into a republic, the PMES was restructured and renamed Security Corps. Throughout the years, the organization changed names many times: Police Corps (1898), Military Police Corps (1908), Military Police Regiment (1924), Police Force (1933), Military Police Force (1940), and finally Military Police.

The Military Police of Espírito Santo has intervened in many regional conflicts including the Paraguayan War (1865), the Revolution at São Paulo (1924), the 1930 Revolution, the Constitutional Movement at São Paulo (1932), and the state riots in the North and Caparao regions. Today the PMES is mainly responsible for maintaining the public order in the state of Espirito Santo. PMES troops perform search and rescue missions, carry out civil defense actions, and are involved in the prevention and fighting of fires and explosions, usually in conjunction with the Military Fireman Corps.

Actions
The most violent regions in the state of  Espírito Santo are located in the Serra and Cariacica municipalities of Greater Vitória. To prevent and combat crime there, the PMES regularly patrols those areas and actively seeks to attend to the necessities of the communities around the city. The PMES has developed safety education programs for the communities that it serves, conducting informational seminars and distributing booklets about public safety and drugs. These proactive actions have reportedly given the organization and its policemen a good image in the state.

Technology
The PMES has an integrated emergency system called the "Centro Integrado de Operações e Defesa Social (CIODES)". This system allows citizens to simultaneously reach the MPES, Fire Corps and the Civilian Police during an emergency by just dialing a single telephone number.  Recently, however, some citizens have complained about having to wait twenty minutes on the phone before CIODES answers their calls .

Organization

The actual PMES Commander is Colonel Oberacy Emmerich.

The PMES is divided in:

Special Units
 Forest Police Company Companhia de Polícia Ambiental
 Mounted Police Regiment Regimento de Polícia Montada
 Special Missions Battalion - Batalhão de Missões Especiais
 Metropolitan Ostensive Policement Command - Comando de Policiamento Ostensivo Metropolitano
 Transit Battalion - Batalhão de Trânsito
 Southern Ostensive Policement Command - Comando de Policiamento Ostensivo Sul
 Northern Ostensive Policement Command - Comando de Policiamento Ostensivo Norte
 Shocking Battalion - Batalhão de Choque
 Air Transport and Operation Nucleus - Núcleo de Operação e Transporte Aéreo

Administrative Commands
 Teaching and Instruction Dept - Diretoria de Ensino e Instrução
 Human Resources Dept. - Diretoria de Pessoal
 Computer Science Dept. - Diretoria de Informática
 Intelligence Dept. - Diretoria de Inteligência
 Social Promotion Dept. - Diretoria de Promoção Social
 Logistic Support Dept. - Diretoria de Apoio Logístico
 Financial Dept. - Diretoria de Finanças
 Corregedoria - An internal organization which investigates Police Excesses.

See also
 Espírito Santo
 Military Police of Brazil
Brazilian Federal Police
Federal Highway Police
Brazilian Civil Police
 Brazilian Armed Forces
 Military Police
 Gendarmerie

References

Espirito Santo
Espírito Santo